Richard A. Bernabe is an American photographer, teacher and author, specializing in nature, wildlife and travel photography.

Life and career 
Bernabe's work has been published by The National Geographic Society, Audubon, The Sierra Club, National Parks, Outdoor Photographer and Popular Photography. In 2005, he received the National Conservation Award by Trout Unlimited.

Books 
Wildlife Photography; Richard Bernabe, Ilex Press, 2018, 
Galapagos; Richard Bernabe & Ian Plant
Spirit of Africa; Richard Bernabe
Morocco: Two photographers, one vision; Richard Bernabe & Ian Plant
Namibia: Two photographers, one vision; Richard Bernabe & Ian Plant
South Carolina: Wonder & light; Richard Bernabe, Mountain Trail Press, 2006, 
Creative Photography: 10 easy pieces; Richard Bernabe
Essential Light: Photography's Lifeblood; Richard Bernabe
Essential Composition: A guide for the perplexed; Richard Bernabe
The Great Smoky Mountains: Behind The Lens, Second Edition; Richard Bernabe
Time Passages: Long Exposure Photography Strategies and Techniques; Richard Bernabe

References

External links 
 
 Interesting article about Mr. Bernabe's work

American photographers
Year of birth missing (living people)
Living people